John Alan Lynch (born May 28, 1952) is a Canadian former professional ice hockey defenceman. Lynch played for the Pittsburgh Penguins, Detroit Red Wings and Washington Capitals.

Lynch was born in Toronto, Ontario. He played junior hockey with the Oshawa Generals. He was selected by the Penguins in the 1972 NHL Amateur Draft.

Lynch was traded from Detroit to Washington in February 1975. At the time of the trade, Lynch was a plus-minus rating of -15 after 50 games, but in just 20 games with the Caps he increased this to -54, giving him a total of -69 for the season.

Career statistics

References

External links
Profile at hockeydraftcentral.com
Profile at legends of hockey.net
Profile at hockeydb.com

1952 births
Living people
Canadian ice hockey defencemen
Detroit Red Wings players
Oshawa Generals players
Pittsburgh Penguins draft picks
Pittsburgh Penguins players
Ice hockey people from Toronto
Washington Capitals players
Washington Capitals announcers